Swiss Tamils refer to the Swiss citizens of Tamil as well as expatriate residents of Tamil origin living in Switzerland. Most of the Tamils in Switzerland are from Sri Lanka, who came to Switzerland during 1980s and 1990s as refugees due to the Sri Lankan Civil War. The Tamils are well integrated in the Swiss society and have proved themselves as a hard-working people and many young Tamils are doing well in school. Tamil values are still strong among the community, caste system and arranged wedding are common. The second generation seem to be better integrated than the first generation, but most still follow the old ways.

Demographics

About 42,000 Tamils are living in Switzerland and 10% of them have been naturalised. This figure does not include most of the second-generation Tamils born to parents with Swiss citizenship.  The Tamils in Switzerland live mainly in the German-speaking areas, such as cantons Bern, Zurich and Basel.

Religion

The majority of Hindus in Switzerland are Tamils. Between 1990s and 2000s, were around twenty Hindu temples founded by the Tamils. The Sri Sivasubramaniar Temple in Zurich is the most famous and largest Hindu temple in Switzerland. Most of Tamil Christians in Switzerland are integrated in Swiss parishes. The majority of Tamil Christians live in canton Zurich.

Politics

Switzerland was one of the few Sri Lankan Tamil diaspora countries, where the Tamil Tigers could act legally. During the last phase of Sri Lankan civil war, more than 10 000 Tamils protested in front of the United Nations Office in Switzerland.

See also
Sri Lankans in Switzerland
Sri Lankan Tamils
Sri Lankan Tamil diaspora
Tamil Diaspora
Tamil People

References

Switzerland
Switzerland
Immigration to Switzerland